Phillip Donn DuBois (born November 16, 1956) is a former American football tight end in the National Football League for the Washington Redskins.  He also played for the Washington Federals of the United States Football League.  DuBois played college football at San Diego State University. He attended Cerritos Junior College and Norwalk High School in southern California.

References

American football tight ends
Washington Redskins players
Sportspeople from Rochester, Minnesota
Cerritos Falcons football players
San Diego State Aztecs football players
1956 births
Living people